The Chancel Repairs Act 1932 (22 & 23 Geo. V c.20) is an Act of Parliament of the Parliament of the United Kingdom that reasserts and imposes a chancel repair liability on the owners of certain real property.

The Act moved jurisdiction from the ecclesiastical courts to the county courts.

The law was upheld in the case of Aston Cantlow PCC v. Wallbank [2003] UKHL 37. The House of Lords re-asserted that the liability, thought by many to be anachronistic, persisted in English law. It had been declared by the Court of Appeal to be contrary to Article 1 of the First Protocol of the European Convention on Human Rights.

Though repeal has been recommended both by the Law Commission in its 1985 report and General Synod of the Church of England, only limited reform will be brought in during 2013 under the Land Registration Act 2002 as amended by the Land Registration Act 2002 (Transitional Provisions)(No 2) Order 2003.

References

External links

http://www.legislation.gov.uk/uksi/2003/2431/contents/made

United Kingdom Acts of Parliament 1932
Property law of the United Kingdom
1932 in British law
Christianity and law in the 20th century